Halafta or Rabbi Halafta (רבי חלפתא) was a rabbi who lived in Sepphoris in the Galilee during the late 1st and early 2nd centuries CE (second generation of tannaim). He was the father of Jose ben Halafta, and one of the latter's teachers of halakha. He is always cited without patronymic or cognomen.

His descent is traced back to Jonadab the Rechabite. He was a senior contemporary of Gamaliel II and Johanan ben Nuri and conducted a rabbinic school at Sepphoris. Here he introduced some ritual reforms.

Tradition relates that, together with Hananiah ben Teradion and Eleazar ben Mattai, he saw the monuments which Joshua had placed in the Jordan River.

Ḥalafta seems to have attained an advanced age. He communicated to Gamaliel II an order given by his grandfather Gamaliel I, and which he had himself heard in the last years of Judea's independence; he subsequently participated in the Akavia controversy, and later he is met with in the company of Eleazar ben Azariah, Ḥuẓpit the interpreter, Yeshebab, and Johanan ben Nuri, when they were old. But few halakhot are preserved in his name, and most of these were transmitted by his more famous son, R. Jose.

One of Jose's sons was named Halafta after his grandfather, but he died young.

References

 Jewish Encyclopedia Halafta

1st-century rabbis
2nd-century rabbis
Mishnah rabbis
1st-century births
2nd-century deaths